"Flickorna på TV 2" (The Girls on TV 2) became one of Swedish pop group Gyllene Tider's early hit songs. The song was written by Per Gessle and Mats "M.P." Persson, and was released as a single on 10 December 1979. The single had a double A-side, with "Himmel No. 7". However, most attention was brought to "Flickorna på TV 2", and one week later the single was re-released as a double A-side. The single topped the Swedish singles chart on 22 February 1980. "Flickorna på TV 2" was re-released in 1989.

Single track listing

1979
"Himmel No. 7" - 4.34
"Flickorna på TV 2 - 3.50

1989
"Flickorna på TV 2" (Remix '89) - 7.18
"Himmel No. 7" - 3.50
"Flickorna på TV 2" (7" version) - 4:34

Charts

References

External links
 Gyllene Tider discography
 Elektroniska tider - Flickorna på TV 2
 Elektroniska tider - Flickorna på TV 2 Remix '89

1979 songs
1989 singles
Gyllene Tider songs
Number-one singles in Sweden
Songs written by Per Gessle
Swedish-language songs
Songs written by Mats Persson (musician)